This is a list of women who have won the Miss República Dominicana Universo, Miss Mundo Dominicana, Miss República Dominicana Internacional, and Miss República Dominicana Tierra beauty pageants..

Miss República Dominicana titleholders

 

Color key

 *entered Miss World 1966
 **Handpicked
 ***Different pageant by Gatsby Dominicana Modeling Agency
 ****Didn't enter any international pageant

Miss Mundo Dominicana titleholders

Color Key

 * Entered in Miss International 1971
 ** Entered in Señorita República Dominicana 1965
 *** Semi-finalist in Miss America Latina 2006
 **** Didn't enter to any international pageant
 ***** Handpicked

Miss República Dominicana Internacional titleholders
Color Key

Miss República Dominicana Tierra titleholders
Color Key

References

External links 
Official Miss Dominican Republic website

Miss Dominican Republic titleholders
Miss Dominican Republic titleholders
Miss Dominican Republic titleholders